Fred Luke (born November 12, 1946) is an American athlete. He competed in the men's javelin throw at the 1972 Summer Olympics.

References

1946 births
Living people
Athletes (track and field) at the 1972 Summer Olympics
American male javelin throwers
Olympic track and field athletes of the United States
Sportspeople from Bellingham, Washington